Gilbert Plains Municipality is a rural municipality (RM) in the Canadian province of Manitoba.

History

The RM was incorporated on January 1, 2015, via the amalgamation of the RM of Gilbert Plains and the Town of Gilbert Plains. It was formed as a requirement of The Municipal Amalgamations Act, which required that municipalities with a population less than 1,000 amalgamate with one or more neighbouring municipalities by 2015. The Government of Manitoba initiated these amalgamations in order for municipalities to meet the 1997 minimum population requirement of 1,000 to incorporate a municipality.

Communities
Ashville
 Gilbert Plains (unincorporated urban community)
 Halicz
 Venlaw
 Zoria

Demographics 

See also
Gilbert Plains station

References 

Rural municipalities in Manitoba
2015 establishments in Manitoba
Manitoba municipal amalgamations, 2015
Populated places established in 2015